Dancing in the Streets: A History of Collective Joy is a book authored by Barbara Ehrenreich.

Description 

The author coins the term "collective joy" to describe group events which involve music, synchronized movement, costumes, and a feeling of loss of self.  There is no precise word in English to describe the phenomenon.

The book describes cycles of creation and suppression of collective joy events.  The events generally arise spontaneously and are regarded as dangerous (see Collective hysteria, Riot).  The powerful elements of society gradually convert the participants into spectators.  This conversion drains the events of their power, and the cycle begins anew.  The author describes Western Society as particularly lacking in such events and describes current and recent examples of Collective Joy events.

Well-known examples of Collective Joy

Historical 
 Woodstock Festival

Current 
 Brazilian Carnival and Mardi Gras
 Burning Man: Possibly the best modern example of collective joy, this event erases social boundaries, and encourages participation as a near-religious experience. 
 Rock concerts and raves: The most familiar example of collective joy to most Americans.  The term especially applies to Grateful Dead concerts.
 Love Parade: costumed dancers and electronic music festival held in many cities around the world.

Collective Joy in transition 
 Sports fans: The author contends that group movement like "the wave" and costuming (body paint, team colors) represent an attempt by participants to wrest the spectator nature of professional sports back into the realm of collective joy, by making fans active participants in the team events.
 Halloween: In the past three decades, Halloween has transitioned from a children's holiday to an adult holiday, including street fairs in major cities such as New York's Village Halloween Parade and San Francisco's Castro District.

See also 
Collective effervescence
Collective identity

External links 
 Barbara Ehrenreich's official website

2007 non-fiction books
Group processes
Books about social psychology
Metropolitan Books books
Books by Barbara Ehrenreich